Religion in Iraq dates back to Ancient Mesopotamia, particularly Sumer, Akkad, Assyria and Babylonia between circa 3500 BC and 400 AD, after which they largely gave way to Syriac Christianity and later to Islam.

A national census has not been held since 1987. Today, the country is overwhelmingly Muslim, who are split into two distinct sects, Shia and Sunni.  According to the CIA World Factbook, approximately 95% to 98% of the population are Muslims.

The remainder follow Christianity, Yazidism, Mandaeism and Yarsanism.

History 

The religious development of Mesopotamia and Mesopotamian culture in general, especially in the south, was not particularly influenced by the movements of the various peoples into and throughout the area. Rather, Mesopotamian religion was a consistent and coherent tradition which adapted to the internal needs of its adherents over millennia of development.

There was increasing syncretism between the Sumerian and Akkadian cultures and deities, with the Akkadians typically preferring to worship fewer deities but elevating them to greater positions of power. Circa 2335 BC, Sargon of Akkad conquered all of Mesopotamia, uniting its inhabitants into the world's first empire and spreading its domination into ancient Iran, the Levant, Anatolia, Canaan and the Arabian Peninsula. The Akkadian Empire endured for two centuries before collapsing due to economic decline, internal strife and attacks from the north east by the Gutian people.

Modern era 

The “Global Index of Religiosity and Atheism” listed Iraq as one of six countries as having the lowest rate of atheism in 2012. After six years, with religious figures coming to power, the situation changed fast as the tide of religiosity receded. According to Iraqi thinker Izzat Shahbandar, this came after ther ruling political class came to power, and their role in sectarianism and state corruption, and by regularly occupying television slots to spread their agendas. The increasing prevalence of atheism and agnosticism signals a tidal public opinion change.

Islam 

Iraq's Muslims follow two distinct traditions, Shia and Sunni Islam. According to CIA World Factbook, Iraq is approximately 95% to 98% Muslim.  Iraq is home to many religious sites important for both Shia and Sunni Muslims.

Baghdad was a hub of Islamic learning and scholarship for centuries and served as the capital of the Abassids. The city of Karbala has substantial prominence in Shia Islam as a result of the Battle of Karbala, which was fought on the site of the modern city on October 10, 680. Similarly, Najaf is renowned as the site of the tomb of Alī ibn Abī Tālib (also known as "Imām Alī"). The Shia consider him to be the righteous caliph and first imām. The city is now a great center of pilgrimage from throughout the Shia Islamic world even though his grave is debatable and it is estimated that only Mecca and Medina receive more Muslim pilgrims.

The city of Kufa was home to the famed Sunni scholar Abu Hanifah, whose school of thought is followed by a sizable number of Sunnis across the globe. Likewise, Samarra is home to the al-Askari Mosque, containing the mausoleums of the Ali al-Hadi and Hasan al-Askari, the tenth and eleventh Shia Imams, respectively, as well as the shrine of Muhammad al-Mahdi, known as the "Hidden Imam", who is the twelfth and final Imam of the Shia of the Ja'farī Madhhab. This has made it an important pilgrimage centre for Ja'farī Shia Muslims. In addition, some female relatives of the Islamic prophet Muhammad are buried in Samarra, making the city one of the most significant sites of worship for Shia and a venerated location for Sunnis.

Smaller sects of Islam exist in the country, such as the small Shia Shaykhist community concentrated in Basra and Karbala.

Arabs 
Iraqi Arabs are a mix between Shia Muslims and Sunni Muslims. The Arab Sunni Muslims live mainly in the area of the so-called Sunni Triangle, but there are other communities in other parts of the country, whereas the Arab Shia Muslims live mainly in Southeast Iraq. The capital Baghdad is mixed of Arab Sunni Muslims and Arab Shia Muslims as well as other religions.

Kurds 

Iraqi Kurds are 98% Sunni Muslims, with a Shia Feyli minority of 2%. Most Kurds are located in the northern areas of the country. Most Iraqi Kurdish Muslims follow the Shafi school of Islamic law, while others are members of either the Qadiri or the Naqshbandi Sufi tariqah.

Turkmens/Turkomans 
About 75% of Iraqi Turkmen are Sunni Muslims, and about 25% practice Shia Islam. Collectively, most Iraqi Turkmen are secular, having internalized the secularist interpretation of state–religion affairs practiced in the Republic of Turkey. The religious and tribal factors and tensions inherent in Iraq’s political culture do not significantly affect the Iraqi Turkmen Sunnis and Shias.

Christianity 

Christianity was brought to Iraq in 40's AD/CE by Thomas the Apostle, Thaddaeus of Edessa and his pupils Aggagi and Mari. Thomas and Thaddeus   

belonged to the twelve Apostles. Iraq's indigenous Assyrian people represent roughly 3% of the population (earlier CIA Factbook), mostly living in Northern Iraq, concentrated in the Ninewa and Dahuk governorates. There are no official statistics, and estimates vary greatly. In 1950 Christians may have numbered 10–12% of the population of 5.0 million. They were 8% or 1.4 in a population of 16.3 million in 1987 and 1.5 million in 2003 of 26 million. Emigration has been high since the 1970s. Since the 2003 Iraq War. There has been no official census since 2003, when the Christian population in Iraq numbered 1.2–2.1 million.

Iraqi Christians are divided into four church bodies:
 "Chaldeans" (Chaldean Catholic Church)
 "Assyrians" or "Nestorian" group (Assyrian Church of the East) and (Ancient Church of the East)
 "West Syriac" or "Jacobite" group (Syriac Orthodox Church)
 "Eastern Orthodox" group (Archdiocese of Baghdad, under jurisdiction of the Eastern Orthodox Patriarchate of Antioch and All the East)

Yazidism 

The Yazidis are a group in Iraq who number just over 650,000. Yazidism, or Sherfedin, dates back to pre-Islamic times. Mosul is the principal holy site of the Yazidi faith. The holiest Yazid shrine is that of Sheikh Adi located at the necropolis of Lalish.

Zoroastrianism 
Zoroastrianism was one of the dominant religions in Northern Mesopotamia before the Islamic era. Currently, Zoroastrianism is an officially recognized religion in Iraqi Kurdistan and Iran.

Zoroastrianism has become the fastest growing religion with Kurds, especially in Kurdish-controlled Northern Iraq. Because of the religion's strong ties to Kurdish culture, there has been a recent rebirth of Zoroastrianism in the region, and as of August 2015 the Kurdistan Regional Government (KRG) officially recognized Zoroastrianism as a religion within Kurdish Iraq. Arguably the world’s oldest monotheistic religion, Zoroastrianism (Zardashti in Kurdish) has almost disappeared in the last century until recent years. According to Yasna, an association that promotes Zoroastrianism in Kurdistan, since 2014 about 15,000 people have registered with the organization, most of them Kurds converting from Islam. People in Iraqi Kurdistan have converted to Zoroastrianism from a Muslim background since 2015, with the first new Zoroastrian temples being built and opened in 2016.

Many Kurdish people converted from Islam to Zoroastrianism, especially after ISIL attacked Iraqi Kurdistan. The surge in Kurdish Muslims converting to Zoroastrianism, the faith of their ancestors is largely attributed to disillusionment with Islam after the years of violence and barbarism perpetrated by the ISIS terrorist group.

On 21 September 2016, the first official Zoroastrian fire temple of Iraqi Kurdistan opened in Sulaymaniyah. Attendees celebrated the occasion by lighting a ritual fire and beating the frame drum or daf.

There are no accurate numbers on the population of Zoroastrians in Iraq because they are listed as "Muslims" on their government-issued documents.

Mandaeism 

According to the Haran Gawaita, a text that tells the history of the Mandaean people, the Mandaeans arrived in the Parthian Empire during the reign of Artabanus II, and later moved to southern Babylonia. This would make the Iraqi presence of Mandaeans approximately 2000 years old, making it the third oldest continually-practiced faith in Iraqi society after Zoroastrianism and Judaism. However, Mandaeans believe their religion predates Judaism and Christianity as a monotheistic faith tracing it back to their first prophet Adam. Until the 2003 Iraq war, there were about 60,000 estimated Mandaeans living in Iraq. The oldest independent confirmation of Mandaean existence in the region is Kartir's inscription at Ka'ba-ye Zartosht. The Mandaean faith is commonly known as the last surviving Gnostic religion. John the Baptist, known as Yahia Yuhanna, is considered to have been the final Mandaean prophet and first true Ris'Amma, or Ethnarch, of the Mandaean people. Most Iraqi Mandaeans live near waterways because of the practice of total immersion (or baptism) in flowing water every Sunday. The highest concentrations are in Amarah, Nasiriyah and Basra. Besides these southern regions and Ahvaz in Iran, large numbers of Mandaeans can be found in Baghdad, giving them easy access to the Tigris River.

Judaism 

Judaism first came to Iraq under the rule of the Babylonian king Nebuchadnezzar II of Babylon. It was a part of the Babylonian Captivity. After the Six-Day War in Israel, rioting caused the majority of Jews to flee. Present estimates of the Jewish population in Baghdad are eight (2007), seven (2008) and five (2013) . Among the American forces stationed in Iraq, there were only three Jewish chaplains.

Hinduism 
There were 3,801 (0.01%) Hindus in Iraq in 2010 according to ARDA.

See also 
 Ancient Mesopotamian religion
 Culture of Iraq
 Demographics of Iraq

References 

'